Hamilton, Ontario has a large variety of historical sites, cultural and educational institutions, and an aviary for exotic birds.

Historical sites and museums 

 31 Service Battalion Museum, accredited military museum, Heritage Museum; dedicated to documenting Combat Service Support in Hamilton; largest collection of the Canadian Women's Army Corps artifacts; located next to HMCS Haida
 Auchmar, historic estate of the Honourable Isaac Buchanan
 Battlefield House Museum, Stoney Creek
 Canadian Warplane Heritage Museum, home of one of the last two remaining operational Lancaster bombers; also in operation Spitfire, Hawker Hurricane, Bristol Bolingbroke
 Dundurn Castle, including the Hamilton Military Museum and Dundurn Park, west end; home of Sir Allan Napier MacNab, former Prime Minister of Upper Canada
 Erland Lee Museum, birthplace of Women's Institutes, Upper Stoney Creek
 Hamilton Children's Museum, east end
 Hamilton Farmer's Market, founded in 1837
 Hamilton Museum of Steam and Technology, east end
 HMCS Haida, National Historic Site, historic naval ship; Canada's most famous warship and the last remaining Tribal Class destroyer in the world
 Nash-Jackson House, at Stoney Creek Battlefield Park
 Ottawa Street North, textile district, voted one of Canada's favourite streets in the 2011 'Great Places in Canada' contest; ranked in Top 5 spots for antique shopping in Canada by CAA Magazine
 Royal Hamilton Light Infantry Heritage Museum, downtown
 Westfield Heritage Village, Flamborough
 Whitehern Historic House & Garden, downtown

Cultural institutions

Art

 Cotton Factory
 Arctic Experience McNaught Gallery
 Art Gallery of Hamilton, downtown; second largest permanent collection in Ontario, and third largest in Canada
 James Street North Art District
 McMaster Museum of Art, west end

Music
 Bach Elgar Choir
 Hamilton Philharmonic Orchestra
 Hess Village, commercial and entertainment hub in historic buildings

Theatre
 Hamilton Theatre Inc., musical theatre

Other popular attractions

Festivals

 Festival of Friends, founded in 1975, the largest annual free music event in Canada

Sports

 Around the Bay Road Race, the longest continuously held long distance foot race in North America (since 1894)
 Canadian Football Hall of Fame, downtown
 CANUSA Games, Hamilton is twinned with Flint, Michigan, and its amateur athletes have competed in these games since 1958
 Jukasa Motor Speedway, a 5/8-mile oval auto racing track, Cayuga, Ontario
 Flamboro Downs and Flamboro Slots, horse racing as well as car racing

Parks, trails and waterfront

 African Lion Safari, Flamborough
 Hamilton Aviary, Westdale, in Churchill Park along Cootes Paradise Sanctuary lookout trails
 Bayfront Park, Pier 4 Park,  Harbour West,  Cootes Paradise, waterfront trail
 Beach strip and lighthouse pier, beach trail
 Bruce Trail, Stoney Creek, Hamilton, Dundas, Flamborough
 Dundas Valley Conservation Area, Dundas
 Gage Park, large historical park in the middle of the city
 Hamilton Farmer's Market
 Pier 4 Park
 Royal Botanical Gardens, west end
 Westfield Heritage Village, Flamborough

References

 
Hamilton, Ontario